Tørres Snørtevold is a 1940 Norwegian comedy film directed by Tancred Ibsen. It starred Alfred Maurstad, Folkman Schaanning and Anton Jessen and was based on the novel Jacob by Alexander Kielland.

Plot

External links
 

1940 films
1940s historical comedy films
Norwegian black-and-white films
1940s Norwegian-language films
Films based on Norwegian novels
Norwegian historical comedy films
Films directed by Tancred Ibsen
1940 comedy films